Zawtar El Charkieh is a town overlooking the Litani River in the province of Nabatiyeh in South Lebanon (85 km from Beirut; 9 km from Nabatiyeh; 475 m above sea level).

Its population exceeds 4,000, most of whom depend on tobacco farming as their main or supplementary source of income. The town has one intermediate public school, one nursery, and one partially functioning health center affiliated with the Ministry of Social Affairs.

Etymology
In Aramaic, Zawtar means the small or the event. In the Syriac language, it is what used to be offered to worshipped idols from flour, butter, and honey, back in antiquity.

Popular folk tales attribute the word to the abundance of grapes, as during its past times, the town was known as a wine village, where the alcoholic beverage was known as Zawtari wine. Camel caravans used to come from the Arabian Peninsula in the pre-Islamic times and load up on local grapes and wines. To this day, one can still find at the west side of the town large jars in the rock which were used to make and store the wine.
In another likely origin of the name, it is relative to the Phoenician princess called Zouzasit, who lived in the town during the Phoenician period.

Historic structures
The ruins in Zawtar El Charkieh are a continuation and extension of those in the neighboring town, Zawtar El Gharbieh. On the southern slopes, there are some natural caves, the most noteworthy being Sawda Cave and Sakkatah Cave. The latter extends to around 50 meters inwards; both caves add a beautiful natural scenery to the landscape.

An old mosque stands in the town and dates back to 1850 CE.

Modern era
In 1995, Israel assassinated a local man, Rida Yassin, better known as Abu-Ali Rida, in the village.

References

External links
 Zaoutar Ech Charqiyeh, Localiban

Populated places in Nabatieh District